Simone Valli (born 3 March 1995) is an Italian footballer who plays as a midfielder and captain for Banteay Meanchey in Cambodian League 2. Though he played football in several countries, he never became a real professional footballer.

Football (Soccer) career

Early career 
Born in Seriate, Bergamo, Simone Valli began his youth career with Virtus Bergamo. In 2013, at the age of eighteen, he moved to Portugal and was signed by S.C. Olhanense. After one year, he joined Cardiff U21 team. Then he moved to Spain, signing up to FC Jumilla, in Segunda División B. In 2016, Valli joined Romanian Liga II side Soimii Panchota.

Thailand 
In 2018 Valli moved to Thailand and became the first Italian footballer to play in a local football club. He was firstly signed by Samut Songkhram FC and after six months Valli joined Surin Sugar KMC FC. In Surin, a town in east Thailand, near the Cambodian border, while in Surin, Valli founded the Italian Soccer Academy to teach local children about European football.

Hong Kong, Venezuela and Nicaragua 
In summer 2019, Valli spent three months in Hong Kong with Squadron FC and North District FC. Then he moved to Venezuela, joining FC Yaracuy. However, due to some bureaucratic problems related to foreign athletes, he was forced to leave the team and in January 2020 he moved to Nicaragua. Despite the COVID-19 pandemic, Valli played until April and, at the end of the season, he was elected Best player for the 2019/2020 season and Best foreigner in the Clausura Tournament.

United Arab Emirates 
After terminating his contract in Nicaragua and as soon as the conditions to fly were favorable, Valli moved to the United Arab Emirates where he was signed by the second division team Regional Sports FC, of Abu Dhabi.  Even though he sustained an injury to his foot (fractured toe), Valli decided to continue training with the team. Valli played in three games with Regional Sports FC before the tournament was paused for two weeks due to COVID-19 outbreaks. After the two weeks break Valli decided to terminate his contract with Regional Sports FC.

Cambodia 
On July 1, 2022, Valli signed with the Cambodian League 2 club Banteay Meanchey FC, and subsequently moved to Cambodia.

Personal life 
Simone Valli travels the world playing soccer. He can speak Spanish, English, French, Italian, Portuguese and Thai

References 

Living people
1995 births
Italian footballers
Association football midfielders
FC Jumilla players
CS Șoimii Pâncota players
Samutsongkhram F.C. players
FC San Marcos players
Italian expatriate footballers
People from Seriate
Sportspeople from the Province of Bergamo
Footballers from Lombardy
Expatriate footballers in Cambodia